Howard Buten (born 1950, Detroit, Michigan) is an American author living in France. He is also a psychologist, a clown, and a violin player. He is the author of five novels, the first of which, entitled When I Was Five I Killed Myself, was published in 1981 and turned into a film under its French title Quand j'avais cinq ans je m'ai tué in 1994.

As a young man Howard Buten encountered a child with autism and this sparked a lifelong interest in the disorder. He has worked on autism as a researcher, clinical psychologist, therapist, and founder of a clinic for the autistic in Paris, France.

He is also a theatrical clown (graduate of Ringling Bros) with the stage name Buffo, who is quite well known in France. He got his start in acting at a very young age, re-enacting scenes from his favorite stories, along with his childhood friends/neighbors.

Buten's first and best known novel, When I Was Five I Killed Myself, is largely unknown in his home country, but has sold more than a million copies in France. He was made Chevalier of the Ordre des Arts et des Lettres, a prominent literary honor, in 1991.

Works 
  (also published under the title Burt) (1981)
  (1984)
  (1987)
  (1989)
  (1991)
  (1994)
  (1995)
  (2000)
  (2003)
  (2005)
 Through the Glass Wall: Journeys Into the Closed-Off Worlds of the Autistic (Bantam, 2004)
 I Understand that If Not Completely Satisfied I Will Be Issued a Full Refund (1996)

References

External links
 Buffo Buten
 

1950 births
Living people
21st-century American psychologists
Chevaliers of the Ordre des Arts et des Lettres
American emigrants to France
American male novelists
20th-century American novelists
20th-century American male writers
American writers in French
21st-century American writers
American clowns
French clowns
20th-century American psychologists